Irmengard Rauch (born 1933 in Dayton, Ohio) is a linguist and semiotician.

She is Professor Emeritus of Germanic Linguistics at the University of California, Berkeley, where she held a position in the Department of German from 1982 until her retirement.

She earned her PhD from the University of Michigan in 1962. Her dissertation was published by Mouton in 1967 under the title, The Old High German Diphthongization: a description of a phonemic change. She held positions at the University of Illinois (1968–82); the University of Pittsburgh (1966–68); the Univ. of Wisconsin (1962–66) before coming to Berkeley.

She is the editor of the book series Berkeley Insights in Linguistics and Semiotics;Berkeley Models of Grammars; Studies in Old Germanic Languages and Literatures; co-editor of the  Interdisciplinary Journal for Germanic Linguistics and Semiotic Analysis.

Honors and recognition 
2011  Eighth Thomas A. Sebeok Fellow (Semiotic Society of America)
1998 Festschrift:  Interdigitations: Essays for Irmengard Rauch 
1996 Honorary Member, American Association of Teachers of German
1994 President, Fifth Congress of the IASS
1985 Distinguished Alumnus Award, University of Dayton
1982 Guggenheim Fellow
1981-83 President, Semiotic Society of America
Life Member, Modern Language Association, Linguistic Society of America

Selected works

The Old High German Diphthongization: A Description of a Phonemic Change. Janua Linguarum, Series Practica XXXVI. The Hague: Mouton. 1967.
Approaches in Linguistic Methodology. Co-ed. C. T. Scott. Introduction, I. Rauch and C. T. Scott, pp. 3–8. Madison: University of Wisconsin Press. 1967.
Approaches…. published in Spanish-language edition as Estudios de metodologia linguistica, translated by M. L. Guillen. Madrid: Editorial Gredos, 1974.
Der Heliand. Wege der Forschung CCCXXI. Co-ed. J. Eichhoff. Introduction, I. Rauch and J. Eichhoff, . Wege der Forschung CCCXXI. Darmstadt: Wissenschaftliche Buchgesellschaft, 1973.
Linguistic Method: Essays in Honor of Herbert Penzl. Co-ed. G. F. Carr. Introduction: "Linguistic Method, A Matter of Principle," I. Rauch, pp. 19-23 [=Janua Linguarum, Series Major 79]. The Hague: Mouton, 1979.
The Signifying Animal: The Grammar of Language and Experience. Co-ed. G.F. Carr. Bloomington: The Indiana University Press, 1980.
Language Change. Co-ed. G. F. Carr. Preface I. Rauch, pp. vii-x. Bloomington: The Indiana University Press, 1983.
The Semiotic Bridge: Trends from California. Co-ed. G.F.Carr. Berlin: Mouton de Gruyter, 1989.
The Old Saxon Language: Grammar, Epic Narrative, Linguistic Interference. New York: Peter Lang Publishing, 1992.
On Germanic Linguistics: Issues and Methods. Co-ed. G. F. Carr and R. Kyes. Preface I. Rauch, pp. v-vi [=Trends in Linguistics 68] Berlin: Mouton de Gruyter,. 1992.
Insights in Germanic Linguistics I. Methodology in Transition. Co-ed. G. F. Carr. Trends in Linguistics, vol 83. Berlin: Mouton de Gruyter, 1995.
Insights in Germanic Linguistics II. Classic and Contemporary. Co-ed. G.F. Carr. [=Trends in Linguistics 94.]. Berlin: Mouton de Gruyter, 1996.
Across the Oceans. Studies from East to west in Honor of Richard K. Seymour. Co-ed. Cornelia Moore. Introduction: "Across Cultures, Across Disciplines," I Rauch, xvii-xix. Honolulu: University of Hawaii, 1995.
Semiotics Around the World: Synthesis in Diversity. Proceedings of the Fifth Congress of the IASS, Berkeley, California, June 12–18, 1994. Vols I & II. Co-ed. G.F. Carr. Berlin: Mouton de Gruyter, 1996.
Semiotic Insights: The Data Do the Talking. Toronto: University of Toronto Press, 1998.
New Insights in Germanic Linguistics I. Co-ed G.F. Carr. New York: Peter Lang Publishing. 1999.
New Insights in Germanic Linguistics II. Co-ed G. F. Carr. New York: Peter Lang Publishing. 2001.
New Insights in Germanic Linguistics III. Co-ed G.F. Carr. New York: Peter Lang Publishing. 2002.
The Gothic Language: Grammar, Genetic Provenance and Typology, Readings. New York: Peter Lang Publishing. 2003.
The Phonology / Paraphonology Interface and the Sounds of German across Time. New York: Peter Lang Publishing . 2008.
The Gothic Language: Grammar, Genetic Provenance and Typology, Readings. (2nd ed. rev.)New York: Peter Lang Publishing. 2011.
BAG — Bay Area German Linguistic Fieldwork Project. New York: Peter Lang Publishing. 2015.
The American Journal of Semiotics, vol. 9, no.4 (1992), co-ed. G.F.Carr.
"Wolfram's Dawn-Song Series: An Explication." Monatshefte LV (1963), 366-74.
"A Problem in Historical Synonymy." Linguistics 6 (1964), 92-98.
"Staging in Historical Phonemics: GMC. *ô > OHG uo." Linguistics 11 (1965), 50-56.
"Phonological Causality and the Early Germanic Consonantal Conditioners of Primary Stressed Vowels." Approaches in Linguistic Methodology. Ed. I. Rauch and C. T. Scott. Madison: The University of Wisconsin Press (1967), 47-61.
"Dimensions of Sound in Relation to an Early Hölderlin Poem." Linguistics 34 (1967), 46-54.
"The Heliand Versus 5-7 Again." Folia Linguistica II (1968), 39-47.
"Heliand i-Umlaut Evidence for the Original Dialect Position of Old Saxon." Lingua 24 (1970), 365-73.
"Das germanische reduplizierte Präteritum – Gunnar Bech." Lingua 27 (1971), 367-81.
"The Germanic Dental Preterite, Language Origin, and Linguistic Attitude."Indogermanische Forschungen 77 (1972), 215-33.
"'Heliand' i-Umlaut . . . " reprinted in Der Heliand. Ed. J. Eichhoff and I. Rauch, Wege der Forschung CCCXXI. Darmstadt: Wissenschaftliche Buchgesellschaft (1973), 461-70.
"Old High German Vocalic Clusters," Issues in Linguistics: Papers in Honor of Henry and Renee Kahane. Ed, B. J. Kachru et al. Urbana: University of Illinois Press (1973), 774-79.
"Some North-West Germanic Dental Conditioners and Laryngeal Effect." Husbanding the Golden Grain: Studies in Honor of Henry W. Nordmeyer. Ed. L. Frank and E. George. Ann Arbor: University of Michigan German Department (1973), 255-64.
"Were Verbs in Fact Noun Subsidiaries?" Proceedings of the Eleventh International Congress of Linguists. Ed. L. Heilmann. Bologna: Societa editrice il Mulino (1974), 609-15.
"Die phonologische Basis des Deutschen: unter- und überphonemische Faktoren."Jahrbuch für Internationale Germanistik VI (1915), 62-71.
"What Can Generative Grammar Do for Etymology?: An Old Saxon Hapax." Semasia:Beiträge zur germanisch-romanischen Sprachforschung 2 (1975), 249-60.
"Semantic Features Inducing the Germanic Dental Preterite Stem." Studies in the Linguistic Sciences 5 (1975), 126-38.
"Linguistic Method: Yesterday and Today." ERIC ED 917 (1976), 18 pp
"Where Does Language Borrowing End and Genetic Relationship Begin?" Approaches to Language. Ed. McCormack and Wurm. The Hague: Mouton (1978), 245-55.
"Language-likeness." Studies in the Linguistic Sciences. Vol. 8 (1978), 183-89.
"Semiotics and Language." The Language Quarterly (University of S. Florida). Vol. XVII (1978), 2-6.
"Distinguishing Semiotics from Linguistics and the Position of Language in Both." The Sign: Semiotics Around the World . Ed. R.W. Bailey et al.(1978), 328-34.
"The State of the Semiotics Curriculum." Semiotic Scene. Vol. 2, no. 4 (1978), 151-55.
"Semantic Naturalness in Word-Building: East German Nur-." Linguistic Method: Essays in Honor of Herbert Penzl. Ed. I.Rauch and G.F. Carr. The Hague: Mouton (1979), 13-17.
"The Language-Inlay in Semiotic Modalities." Semiotica 25 (1979), 67-76.
"First-Language Syntax in the New High German of Swiss Authors." Amsterdamer Beiträge zur neueren Germanistik. Vol. 9. Ed. M. Burkhard and G. Labroisse (1979), 23-32.
"What is Signifying?" The Signifying Animal: The Grammar of Language and Experience. Ed. I. Rauch and G. F. Carr. Bloomington: The Indiana University Press (1980), 1-8.
"Between Linguistics and Semiotics: Paralanguage." The Signifying Animal: The Grammar of Language and Experience. Ed. I. Rauch and G F. Carr. Bloomington: The University of Indiana Press (1980), 284-89.
"Robert Walser's 'Van Gogh': Ich Allein oder Wir Alle? Studie zur linguistischen und literarischen Interpretation." Akten des VI. Internationalen Germanisten-Kongresses, Basel. Co-author M. Burkhard (1980), 291-97.
"Inversion, Adjectival Participle, and Narrative Effect in Old Saxon." Niederdeutsches Jahrbuch 104 (1981), 22-30.
"Semiotics in Search of Method: Narrativity." Semiotica 34 (1981), 167-76.
"What is Cause?" The Journal of Indo-European Studies 9 (1981), 319-29.
"The State of the Semiotics Curriculum II." Semiotic Scene 4 (1981), 64-77.
"Toward a Schwa in Gothic." Beiträge zur Geschichte der deutschen Sprache und Literatur(Tübingen) 103 (1981), 392-401.
"Historical Analogy and the Peircean Categories." Proceedings of the III International Conference on Historical Linguistics. (Current Issues in Linguistic Theory, Ed. P. Maher) (1982), 359-67.
"Uses of the Germanic Past Perfect in Epic Backgrounding" The Journal of Indo-European Studies 10 (1982), 301-14.
"Evolution in a Semantic Set: Text, Discourse, Narrative." Language Change. Ed. I. Rauch and G. F. Carr. Bloomington: The Indiana University Press (1983), 28-38.
"The Semiotic Paradigm and Language Change." Semiotics 1981. Ed. J. Deely and M. Lenhart. New York: Plenum (1983), 193-200.
"On the Modality of the Article." Monatshefte 75 (1983), 156-62.
"'Symbols Grow': Creation, Compulsion, Change." American Journal of Semiotics 3 (1984), 1-23.
"Semiotists on Semiotists: The Heartbeat of the Sign." Semiotica 55 (1985), 227-50.
"Syntax des Altsächsischen." Sprachgeschichte: Ein Handbuch zur Geschichte der deutschen Sprache und ihrer Erforschung. Ed. W. Besch, O. Reichmann, S. Sonderegger. Berlin, New York: de Gruyter (1985), 1089-93.
"Semiotics and Linguistics." Encyclopedic Dictionary of Semiotics. Ed. T. A. Sebeok et al. Berlin: Mouton/de Gruyter (1986), 912-920.
"Language and Other Sign Systems." Encyclopedic Dictionary of Semiotics. Ed. T. A. Sebeok et al. Berlin: Mouton/de Gruyter (1986), 433-438.
"The Mendacious Mode in Modern German." Els Oksaar Festschrift. Ed. Hartwig Wittje. Tubingen: Gunter Narr (1986), 343-351.
"Evidence of Language Change." Research Guide for Language Change. Ed. E. Polome. Berlin: Mouton de Gruyter (1990), 37-70.
"The Impact of Language (Morphology) on Luther: Sapir-Whorf Redux." Languages and Cultures: Studies in Honor of Edgar C. Polome. Ed. M. A. Jazayery and W. Winter. Berlin: Mouton de Gruyter (1988), 535-549.
"Peirce, Saussure, Uexküll." Proceedings of the III International Congress of the History of Linguistics (Princeton University, 19–23 August 1984). Ed. L. G. Kelley et al. Amsterdam: Benjamins (1987), 575-583.
"Old Saxon hell, Drawl, and Silence." Althochdeutsch: Festschrift für Rudolf Schutzeichel. Ed. R. Bergmann. H. Tiefenbach, L. Voetz. Heidelberg: Carl Winter (1987), 1145-1151.
"Peirce: 'With No Pretension to Being a Linguist.'" Semiotica. 65 (1987) 29-43.
"How Do Germanic Linguistic Data React to Newer Literary Methods?" Germania: Comparative Studies in the Old Germanic Languages and Literatures. Ed. D. Calder and T. Craig Christy. Wolfeboro, NH: D. S. Brewer (1988), 97-111.
"The Saussurrean Axes Subverted." dispositio. XII (1988) 35-44.
"San Francisco Bay Area German: A Pilot Study." Co-author with BAG Graduate Student Group. Monatshefte. 80 (1988) 94-102.
"Is There an Aspect Distinction in Certain Strong/Weak Verb Alternations? Evidence from German in the San Francisco Bay Area" Co-author with BAG Graduate Student Group. Semper Idem et Novus: Festschrift for Frank Banta. Ed. F.G. Gentry et al. Goppingen: Kummerle Verlag (1988), 433-443.
"Language Change in Progress: Privacy and Firstness," The Semiotic Bridge: Trends from California. Ed. I. Rauch & G F. Carr. Berlin: Mouton de Gruyter (1989), 375-383.
"Medicine and Semiotics," Bochum Publications in Evolutionary Cultural Semiotics, Vol 10: Semiotics in the Individual Sciences. Ed. W. Koch. Bochum: Universitätsverlag Dr. Norbert Brockmeyer (1990) 299-317.
"On the Nature of Firsts in Language Change," Proceedings of the XIV International Congress of Linguists. Ed. W. Banner, J. Schildt, D. Viehweger. Berlin: Akademie Verlag (1991) 1432-1434.
"Basler Rezept I: Method, Medical Code, and the Polysemous Symptom," Herbert Kolb Festschrift. Ed. Klaus Matzel and Hans-Gert Roloff. Bern: Peter Lang A. G. (1989), 523-27.
"Computerizing the Bay Area German Project," Co-author B. Schiffman and G. Trauth.American Journal of Germanic Linguistics and Literatures. vol. no 2 (July 1989) 177-198.
"Bilingual Pragmatics: Evidence from the San Francisco Bay Area German Project," Co-author with BAG Graduate Student Group. Zeitschrift für Dialektologie und Linguistik LVII(1990) 295-305.
"An Unexploited Rule for Morphological Naturalness," Proceedings of the Nineteenth Annual Western Conference on Linguistics II. Ed. Vida Samiian et al. Fresno: California State University Department of Linguistics (1990) 277-286,
"Semiotics: (No) canon, (no) theses," Semiotica 86 (1991) 85-92.
"Early New High German e-Plural," Beiträtge zur Geschichte der deutschen Sprache und Literatur. (Tubingen) 113 (1991) 367-383.
"Another Old English – Old Saxon Isogloss: (REM) Activity," De Gustibus: Essays for Alain Renoir. In Albert Bates Lord Studies in Oral Tradition, 10, ed. J. M. Foley. New York: Garland (1992) 480-493.
"Old Saxon Barred Vowel," On Germanic Linguistics: Issues and Methods. Ed. I. Rauch, G.F. Carr, R. Kyes, Berlin: Mouton de Gruyter (1992) 245-252.
"Icon Deconstruction and Icon Construction," in: Signs of Humanity/ L'Homme et ses signes I-III. Ed. G. Deladelle et al.. Berlin: Mouton de Gruyter, 1992, 401-405.
Deconstruction, Prototype Theory and Semiotics," The American Journal of Semiotics 9, no. 4 (1992) 129-38.
"Discourse, Space, Writing, "The American Journal of Semiotics 9, no.4 (1992) 5-10.
"The Old English Genesis B Poet: Bilingual or Interlingual?' American Journal of Germanic Linguistics and Literatures v. 5, no. 2 (1993) 163-184.
"Toward Germanic Schwa: Old Saxon Evidence," Vielfalt des Deutschen. Ed. K. J. Mattheier, K-P. Wegera et al. Frankfurt: Peter Lang, 1993:61-66.
"1994," Semiotica 98 (1994) 157-62.
"Linguistic Polygraphy and Linguistic Polyphony: Old Saxon /ie, uo/," IV. Proceedings of the xv International Congress of Linguists. Ed. Andr6 Crochetière, Jean-Claude Boulanger and Conrad Ouellon. Quebec: Les Presses de l'Université Laval, 1994, 263-266.
"IASS World Congresses: The Fifth," Proceedings of the I Congresso Mundial de Semiotica y Comunicacion, Monterrey, Mexico (forthcoming).
"Germanic Linguistics in the Post-Modern Age," Insights in Germanic Linguistics I, Methodology in Transition. Ed. I. Rauch and G. F. Carr in the series Trends in Linguistics 83. Berlin: Mouton de Gruyter, 1995, 1-4.
"Formal and Less Formal Rules, "Insights in Germanic Linguistics I,: Methodology in Transition. Ed. I. Rauch and G.F. Carr in series Trends in Linguistics 83. Berlin: Mouton de Gruyter, 1995, 265-273.
"BAG IV: Phonological Interference," (principal author with BAG students). In: Insights in Germanic Linguistics I, Methodology in Transition. Ed. I. Rauch and G. F. Carr Trends in Linguistics 83. Berlin: Mouton de Gruyter, 1995, 275-292.
"Semiotics and Language," Reprinted by The Language Quarterly in the Gedenkschrift for Dr. Albert Gessman .
"Semiotic Pronominal Configurations: A Question of Pathological Language," Semiosis.
"English Phonetic Contrasts in San Francisco Bay Area German," (Co-author with BAG students), in: Across the Oceans: Studies from East to West in Honor of Richard K. Seymour.Ed. I. Rauch and Cornelia Moore. Honolulu: University of Hawaii, 1995, 167-175.
"My Language is the Sum Total of Myself: Humboldt and Peirce,"Essays in Honor of Thomas A. Sebeok. Ed. Norma Tasca. (Cruzeiro Semiotico, Revista Semestral Nr. 22-25) Porto, Portugal: Fundação Eng. Antonio de Almeida, 1995, 109-117.
"Zwei Variationen von 'politisch-korrektem' Deutsch." Ed. M.S. Batts. Akten des IX. Kongresses der Internationalen Vereinigung für germanistische Sprach-und Literaturwissenschaft (IVG). Tubingen: Niemeyer, 1996.
"'Symbols Grow' II" in Semiotics Around the World: Synthesis in Diversity: Proceedings of the Fifth Congress of the IASS, Berkeley, 1994. Vol. I. Berlin: Mouton de Gruyter (1996), 87-93.
"BAG V: PC German," (Co-author with BAG Graduate Student Group), Insights in Germanic Linguistics II: Classic and Contemporary. Ed. I.Rauch and G.F. Carr (Trends in Linguistics 94) Berlin: Mouton de Gruyter, (1996) 207-226.
"Openness, Eco, and the End of Another Millenium," in Reading Eco: A Pretext to Literary Semiotics. Ed. R. Capozzi. Bloomington, IN: Indiana University Press, (1997) 137- 146.
"Babysitter/in, lernbehindert, and other German PC Terms" (Co-author with Arden Smith and Simona Yee), in German Studies in Honor of Anatoly Liberman, ed. by M. Berryman, K.G. Goblirsch and M.H. Taylor. NOWELE 31-32,(1997).
"Feature Spreading in Old High German and Old Saxon: Umlaut, Monophthongization, Pragmatics,"890-New Insights in Germanic Linguistics I. Ed. I. Rauch and G.F. Carr. (Berkeley Insights in Linguistics and Semiotics 33) New York: Peter Lang Publishing (1999) 201-210.
"Syntax des Altniederdeutschen (Altsächsisch)", (expanded revision) in Sprachgeschichte: Ein Handbuch zur Geschichte der deutschen Sprache und ihrer Erforschung.Ed.W. Besch et al., Berlin: Walter de Gruyter, (2000) 1263-1269.
"BAG VI: Toward a Grammar of German e-mail," (Co-author with BAG German student group). New Insights in Germanic Linguistics I. Ed. I. Rauch and G.F. Carr. (Berkeley Insights in Linguistics and Semiotics 33).New York: Peter Lang Publishing (1999) 181-200.
"Zum Gedenken an Herbert Penzl." (Co-author with Karl Kaussen). Jahrbuch für Internationale Germanistik 28 (1996) 9-24.
"On the BBC/A&E Bicentennial 'Pride and Prejudice,'" Interdisciplinary Journal for Germanic Linguistics and Semiotic Analysis 2(1997) 327-346.
"BAG VI-2: Toward a Grammar of German Snail Mail," (principal author with BAG students), New Insights in Germanic Linguistics II, ed. I. Rauch and G.F. Carr. New York: Peter Lang Publishing (2001) 147-158.
"Analogy's Hidden Triggers," New Insights in Germanic Linguistics II, ed. I. Rauch and G.F. Carr. New York: Peter Lang Publishing (2001) 159-166.
"Bible Epic, Saxon," Medieval Germany: An Encyclopedia, ed. J.M. Jeep. New York: Garland (2001) 56-59.
"Paralanguage: Evidence from Germanic," Semiotica 135 (2001) 147-156.
"On the German Language of Civility/Vulgarity: Evidence from the San Francisco Bay Area," (principal author with BAG students). Interdisciplinary Journal for Germanic Linguistics and Semiotic Analysis 5 (2000): 175-198.
"Herbert Penzl," Internationales Germanisten Lexikon 1800-1950. (Co-author with G. F. Carr). Marbach: Arbeitsstelle für die Erforschung der Geschichte der Germanistik (2000).
"Gothic h, r, hw and Ranked Constraints," Verba et Litterae: Explorations in Germanic Languages and German Literature, ed. A. Wedel and H-J. Busch. Newark DL: Lingua Text (2002) 117-123.
"Historical Pragmatics: Pervasive Evidence from Old Saxon," New Insights in Germanic Linguistics III. ed. I. Rauch and G. F. Carr. New York: Peter Lang Publishing (2002): 211-219.
"A Semiotic Panorama, Alamode Borrowing and Diverse German," Semiotica, 141 (2002): 377-386.
"On the German Language of Civility/Vulgarity: Evidence from Bonn," Interdisciplinary Journal for Germanic Linguistics and Semiotic Analysis 8,2[2003]: 261-289.
"Bag VIII. Emotion, Gesture, and Language," (Principal author with BAG students).Interdisciplinary Journal for Germanic Linguistics and Semiotic Analysis 10,1 (2005): 17-46.
"The Newly Found Leipzig Heliand Fragment." Interdisciplinary Journal for Germanic Linguistics and Semiotic Analysis 11,1 (2006) 1-17.
"BAG IX. Toward the Architecture of the Apology," (Principal Author with BAG Students).Interdisciplinary Journal for Germanic Linguistics and Semiotic Analysis 12,1(2007) 135-156.
"Gender Semiotics, Anglo-Frisian wíf and Old Frisian Noun Gender," in Old Frisian Philology [=special issue of Amsterdamer Beiträge zur älteren Germanistik], ed. R. Bremmer et al, (2007): 367-77.
"Translations of the Bible," in The Oxford Dictionary of the Middle Ages," ed. R. F. Bjork. Oxford: Oxford University Press (2010).
"BAG X: Toward the Architecture of the Lie," (Principal Author with BAG students).Interdisciplinary Journal for Germanic Linguistics and Semiotic Analysis 15, 2 (2010) 53-89.
"Rolf H. Bremmer, Jr. An Introduction to Old Frisian." In: NOWELE: 60/61, (Jan. 2011) 199-203.
BAG XI: Toward Human : Canine Communication" (Principal Author with BAG students).Interdisciplinary Journal for Germanic Linguistics and Semiotic Analysis 16, 2 (2011) 203-254.
"Exapted 'oh': How Does It Fit into the Prosodic Hierarchy?" in Vox Germanica: Essays in Germanic Languages and Literature in Honor of James E. Cathey, ed. Stephen Harris and Michael J. Harris et al. Tempe, AZ: The Arizona Center for Medieval and Renaissance Studies (2012) 85-90.
"The Power and the Glory of Sound," [= Eighth Sebeok Fellow Address] The American Journal of Semiotics 28.1-2 (2012) 5-17.
"Hic et Nunc: Evidence from Canine Zoosemiotics." Semiotica 196 (2013) 229-242.
BAG XII: German Netspeak / Textspeak ," (Principal Author with BAG students). Interdisciplinary Journal for Germanic Linguistics and Semiotic Analysis 18,2 (2013)101-127.
"On Gothic in the Computer Age," NOWELE 67 (2014) 231-236.
BAG XIII: "On Laughter: German and English Jokes" (Principal Author with BAG students). Interdisciplinary Journal for Germanic Linguistics and Semiotic Analysis 19,2 (2014).
"On Consonantal Conditioners Again and the Case of Rising Short Old Frisian IU" Interdisciplinary Journal for Germanic Linguistics and Semiotic Analysis 20, 1(2015)
"Preface" in The Old Saxon Heliand: An Annotated English Translation by Tonya Kim Dewey. Lewiston, NY: Edwin Mellen Press (2011).
BAG--Bay Area German Linguistic Fieldwork Project. Peter Lang Publishing; 2015.
Semiotic Insights: The Data Do the Talking. Toronto: University of Toronto Press. 2008.
The Phonology/Paraphonology Interface and the Sounds of German across Time. Peter Lang Publishing. 2011. 
The Gothic Language: Grammar, Genetic Provenance and Typology, Readings. Second edition. Peter Lang Publishing. 2011. 
The Old Saxon Language. Grammar, Epic Narrative,Linguistic Interference. Peter Lang Publishing. 1967. 
The Old High German Diphthongization. A Description of a Phonemic Change. Mouton & Company, 1967. 
Co-editor w Gerald F. Carr: 'Semiotics Around the World: Synthesis in Diversity. Proceedings of the Fifth Congress of the IASS.' Berkeley, CA.Mouton de Gruyter, 1996.
 Insights in Germanic Linguistics I(1995),II(1996) Mouton de Gruyter; New Insights in Germanic Linguistics I(1999), II(2001), III(2002) Peter lang Publishing; The Signifying Animal: 
 The Grammar of Language and Experience (1980) Indiana University Press; Language Change (1983 Indiana University Press); The Semiotic Bridge: Trends from California, Mouton de Gruyter (1989

References

External links
 

Linguists from the United States
Women linguists
People from Dayton, Ohio
1933 births
Living people
Presidents of the Semiotic Society of America